Ermanno Randi (27 April 1920 – 1 November 1951) was an Italian film actor. After serving in the Italian Army during the Second World War, Randi made his screen debut in 1947. He gradually moved up from playing supporting to lead roles. In 1951 he played the tenor Enrico Caruso in The Young Caruso. The same year he was fatally shot by his lover, Giuseppe Maggiore, during a row. Randi was 31.

Filmography

References

External links 
 

1920 births
1951 deaths
Italian male film actors
People from Arezzo
20th-century Italian male actors